Earthquakes in Poland are a rare phenomenon. Most often they are caused by rock bursts in coal or copper mines. Natural ones appear in the Carpathian Mountains, Sudetes, or in the Trans-European Suture Zone. Sometimes events from other countries are felt in Poland.

Natural Earthquakes

Mining-induced earthquakes
Between 2015 and 2019, in Polish mines, 23 strong earthquakes occurred, killing 24 miners and damaging buildings on the surface.

References

Poland
Earthquakes
Earthquakes
Earthquakes
Earthquakes